The  is a group of companies that have supplier, vendor and investment relationships with Toyota Industries and Toyota Motor vehicle manufacturing facilities. It is similar to a keiretsu in that no particular entity has outright control over the entire group, although unlike most keiretsu it does not contain a major bank.

Major group companies 
There are 16 major companies that make up the Toyota Group:

Affiliates or partially owned subsidiaries

 Kyoho kai group – Auto parts company – 211 companies.
 Kyouei kai group – Logistic/facility company – 123 companies.
 KDDI (Toyota owns 11.09% of the company)
 Nagoya Broadcasting Network (Toyota owns 34.6% and is the largest single shareholder in the company; 36.9% of the stock are directly and indirectly (through TV Asahi Holdings Corporation) owned by the Asahi Shimbun Company, making it the largest corporate group shareholder)
 Subaru Corporation, manufacturer of Subaru automobiles. (Toyota owns 20% and is the largest single shareholder in the company)
 Mazda Motor Corporation (Toyota owns 5.05% of the company)
 Suzuki Motor Corporation (Toyota owns 4.9% of the company)
 Isuzu Motors Ltd. (Toyota owns 4.6% of the company)
 Misawa Homes Holdings, Inc. (Toyota owns 13.4% of the company)
 Primearth EV Energy Co (PEVE) – a joint venture between Toyota and Panasonic (1996 to present)
 Toyota Canada Inc. (TCI) – a joint venture between Toyota (51%) and Mitsui & Co. Ltd. (49%) (1964 to present)
 Yamaha Motor Company (Toyota owns 2.8% of the company.)
 Panasonic (Toyota owns 2.8% of the company.)
 Nippon Telegraph and Telephone (Toyota owns 2.09% of the company.)
 MS&AD Insurance Group (Toyota owns 8.88% and is the largest single shareholder in the company.)
 Fuji Pharma Co., Ltd.

Former group companies

 New United Motor Manufacturing, Inc. (NUMMI) – a joint venture between Toyota and General Motors (1984 to 2010)
 United Australian Automobile Industries (UAAI) – a joint venture between Toyota Australia and GM-Holden (1989 to 1996)
Tesla, Inc. (Toyota owned 1.43% of Tesla, Inc.) (2010 to 2016)

Further reading

References

External links
 Toyota Group